The 2018 Meiji Yasuda J2 League (2018 明治安田生命J2リーグ) season was the 47th season of the second-tier club football in Japan and the 20th season since the establishment of J2 League.

Clubs
The participating clubs are listed in the following table:

Personnel and kits

Managerial changes

Foreign players
The total number of foreign players is restricted to five per club. Clubs can register up to four foreign players for a single match-day squad, of which a maximum of three are allowed from nations outside the Asian Football Confederation (AFC). Players from J.League partner nations (Thailand, Vietnam, Myanmar, Cambodia, Singapore, Indonesia, Iran, Malaysia, and Qatar) are exempt from these restrictions.

League table

Results

Promotion–Relegation Playoffs
2018 J.League J1/J2 Play-Offs (2018 J1参入プレーオフ)
Because Machida Zelvia did not own a J1 license for the 2019 season, they were ineligible to participate in the play-offs. Thus, Yokohama FC, finishing third in the season, received a bye into the second round, from which the winner will play the team finishing 16th in J1.

First Semi-Final

Second Semi-Final

Final

Júbilo Iwata remains in J1 League.Tokyo Verdy remains in J2 League.

Top scorers
.

Attendances

References

J2 League seasons
2
Japan
Japan